Bramble yellow mosaic virus (BrmYMV) is a plant pathogenic virus of the family Potyviridae.

External links
 ICTVdB - The Universal Virus Database: Bramble yellow mosaic virus
 Family Groups - The Baltimore Method

Viral plant pathogens and diseases
Potyviruses